Background level may refer to:

 Background (astronomy)
 Background radiation
 Journalism sourcing

See also
 Background (disambiguation)